Pieter de Josselin de Jong (2 August 1861 – 2 June 1906) was a Dutch painter from North Brabant.

Life
Josselin de Jong was born in Sint-Oedenrode and was trained at the art academy in Den Bosch before attending the Royal Academy of Arts in Antwerp. He also attended the École des Beaux-Arts in Paris. He was a member of Arti et Amicitiae and the Pulchri Studio. He died in The Hague.

References 
 Pieter de Josselin de Jong in the RKD

External links
 

1861 births
1906 deaths
People from Sint-Oedenrode
20th-century Dutch painters
19th-century Dutch painters
Dutch male painters
19th-century Dutch male artists
20th-century Dutch male artists